The Subcommittee on State Department and USAID Management, International Operations, and Bilateral International Development is one of seven subcommittees of the United States Senate Foreign Relations Committee.

Jurisdiction
The subcommittee’s responsibilities include all matters involving State Department, USAID, Millennium Challenge Corporation, and Peace Corps management and international operations, bilateral international development policy, and bilateral foreign assistance. This jurisdiction includes the general oversight responsibility for management and operations of the Department of State, USAID, the Broadcasting Board of Governors, and the Foreign Service, as well as public diplomacy matters. This subcommittee will have responsibility for reviewing the budget and operations of the State Department and USAID.

Members, 117th Congress

External links
Senate Committee on Foreign Relations
Senate Foreign Relations Committee subcommittees and jurisdictions

Foreign Relations Senate State Department and USAID Management, International Operations and Bilateral International Development